Earl E. Nelson (August 29, 1937 – November 1, 2016) was a Democratic member of both houses of the Michigan Legislature from 1971 through 1978.

Born in Emerson, Arkansas, Nelson graduated from Michigan State University. He taught in the Lansing schools and worked for the Michigan Chamber of Commerce. In 1970, he won election to the Michigan House of Representatives. After two terms, he won election to the Senate.

Nelson was the founder of the Earl Nelson Singers and was an ordained minister. He was also the Director of Equity for the Michigan Department of Education.

References

1937 births
2016 deaths
African-American state legislators in Michigan
Democratic Party Michigan state senators
Democratic Party members of the Michigan House of Representatives
20th-century American politicians
20th-century African-American politicians
21st-century African-American people